Ahuac District is one of nine districts of the province Chupaca in Peru.

See also 
 Ñawinpukyu

References